Aračić is a Croatian and Serbian surname. It may refer to:
 
Ante Aračić (born 1981), Croatian footballer
Ilija Aračić (born 1970), Croatian footballer
Luka Aračić (born 1981), Croatian long-jumper
Vukoman Aračić (1850-1915), Serbian general
 

Croatian surnames
Serbian surnames